Le Tech is a commune in the Pyrénées-Orientales department in southern France. It is part of the historical Vallespir comarca.

Geography

Localisation 
Le Tech is located east of Prats-de-Mollo-la-Preste, in the canton of Le Canigou and in the arrondissement of Céret.

Neighbouring communes

Land relief 
Elevation ranges from 420 to 2721 meters.

Hydrography 
The territory of Le Tech is shaped by the valley of the river Coumelade and the village itself is located at the confluence of the Coumelade and the river Tech.

Toponymy 
Le Tech takes its name from the Tech river which runs through the village.

History 
The commune of Le Tech was created on March 19, 1862, by a piece of territory being separated from Prats-de-Mollo.

Government and politics

Mayors

Population

Sites of interest 

 Saint Mary church : the ancient church from the 17th c., located near the river, was destroyed by floods in 1940 and a new one was then built above the village.
 St Guillem of Combret Hermitage
 Sainte Cécile de Cos church
 Cos tower
 Saint Côme et Saint-Damien de La Llau church

See also
Communes of the Pyrénées-Orientales department

References

Communes of Pyrénées-Orientales
1862 establishments in France